Walter Scott (2 May 1892 – 4 September 1963) was a South African cricketer. He played in three first-class matches for Border in 1923/24.

See also
 List of Border representative cricketers

References

External links
 

1892 births
1963 deaths
South African cricketers
Border cricketers
People from Queenstown, South Africa
Cricketers from the Eastern Cape